Byera Village is a historic settlement in Saint Vincent and the Grenadines.It is located in Charlotte Parish. It has a population over 4000 residents is considered being one of the country's  largest settlement. Also during the colonial period it serves as a boundary between the local Indians and the white planters in the parish. It was settled by the free slaves after emancipation. Many of older residents migrated from Barbados and Trinidad.

Populated places in Saint Vincent and the Grenadines